The Green River Formation is an Eocene geologic formation that records the sedimentation in a group of intermountain lakes in three basins along the present-day Green River in Colorado, Wyoming, and Utah. The sediments are deposited in very fine layers, a dark layer during the growing season and a light-hue inorganic layer in the dry season. Each pair of layers is called a varve and represents one year. The sediments of the Green River Formation present a continuous record of six million years. The mean thickness of a varve here is 0.18 mm, with a minimum thickness of 0.014 mm and maximum of 9.8 mm.

The sedimentary layers were formed in a large area named for the Green River, a tributary of the Colorado River. The three separate basins lie around the Uinta Mountains (north, east, and south) of northeastern Utah:
 an area in northwestern Colorado east of the Uintas
 a larger area in the southwest corner of Wyoming just north of the Uintas known as Lake Gosiute
 the largest area, in northeastern Utah and western Colorado south of the Uintas, known as Lake Uinta

Fossil Butte National Monument in Lincoln County, Wyoming is in a part of the formation known as Fossil Lake because of its abundance of exceptionally well preserved fish fossils.

Lithology and formation

The formation of intermontane basin / lake environments during the Eocene resulted from mountain building and uplift of the Rocky Mountains (late Cretaceous Sevier orogeny and the Paleogene Laramide orogeny). Tectonic highlands supplied the Eocene sedimentary basins with sediment from all directions: the Uinta Mountains in the center; the Wind River Mountains to the north; the Front Range, Park Range and Sawatch Range of the Colorado Rockies to the east; the Uncompahgre Plateau and the San Juan Mountains to the south and finally, the Wasatch Mountains of Utah and the ranges of eastern Idaho to the west.

The lithology of the lake sediments is varied and includes sandstones, mudstones, siltstones, oil shales, coal beds, saline evaporite beds, and a variety of lacustrine limestones and dolomites. Volcanic ash layers within the various sediments from the then active Absaroka Volcanic field to the north in the vicinity of Yellowstone and the San Juan volcanic field to the southeast provide dateable horizons within the sediments.

The trona (hydrated sodium bicarbonate carbonate) beds of Sweetwater County, Wyoming are noted for a variety of rare evaporite minerals. The Green River Formation, is the type locality for eight rare minerals: bradleyite, ewaldite, loughlinite, mckelveyite-(Y), norsethite, paralabuntsovite-Mg, shortite and wegscheiderite. It also has a natural occurrence of moissanite (SiC) and 23 other valid mineral species.

Cyclicity
The beds display a pronounced cyclicity, with the precession, obliquity, and eccentricity orbital components all clearly detectable. This enables the beds to be internally dated with a high degree of accuracy, and astrochronological dates agree very well with radiometric dates.

Fossil zones

Within the Green River Formation of southwest Wyoming in the area known as Fossil Lake, two distinct zones of very fine-grained lime muds are particularly noted for preserving a variety of complete and detailed fossils. These layers are an Eocene Lagerstätte, a rare place where conditions were right for a rich accumulation of undisturbed fossils. These are easily split along the layers to reveal the fossils. This thin zone represents some 4000 years of deposition.

The limestone matrix is so fine-grained that fossils include rare soft parts of complete insects and fallen leaves in spectacular detail. Some 35,000 fossiliferous rocks from the Green River Formation are housed at the Smithsonian Institution in Washington, D.C.

Fish fossils of Diplomystus and Knightia are found in Fossil Lake but not in Lake Gosiute. Only Lake Gosiute has fossils of catfish (Ictaluridae and Hypsidoridae) and suckers (Catostomidae). The catfish are found mostly in the deepest parts of the lake. 
 

The various fossil beds of the Green River Formation span a 5 million year period, dating to between 53.5 and 48.5 million years old. This span of time includes the transition between the moist early Eocene climate and the slightly drier mid-Eocene. The climate was moist and mild enough to support crocodiles, which do not tolerate frost, and the lakes were surrounded by sycamore ( e.g. Platanus wyomingensis ) forests. As the lake configurations shifted, each Green River location is distinct in character and time. The lake system formed over underlying river deltas and shifted in the flat landscape with slight tectonic movements, receiving sediments from the Uinta highland and the Rocky Mountains to the east and north. The lagerstätten formed in anoxic conditions in the fine carbonate muds that formed in the lakebeds. Lack of oxygen slowed bacterial decomposition and kept scavengers away, so leaves of palms, ferns and sycamores, some showing the insect damage they had sustained during their growth, were covered with fine-grained sediment and preserved. Insects were preserved whole, even delicate wing membranes and spider spinnerets.

Vertebrates were preserved too, including the osteoderms of Borealosuchus, the crocodile that was an early clue to the mild Eocene climate of Western North America. Fish are common. The fossils of the herring-like Knightia, sometimes in dense layers, as if a school had wandered into anoxic water levels and were overcome, are familiar to fossil-lovers and are among the most commonly available fossils on the commercial market. There were two genera of indigenous freshwater stingray, Heliobatis and Asterotrygon. Approximately sixty vertebrate taxa in all have been found at Green River. Besides fishes they include at least eleven species of reptiles, and some birds and one armadillo-like mammal, Brachianodon westorum, with some scattered vertebrae of others, like the dog-sized Meniscotherium and Notharctus, one of the first primates. The earliest known bats (Icaronycteris index
, and Onychonycteris finneyi), already full-developed for flight, are found here. Even a snake, Boavus idelmani, found its way into a lake and was preserved in the mudstone.

Discovery of the fossil beds
The first documented records of (invertebrate) fossils from what is now called the Green River Formation are in the journals of early missionaries and explorers such as S. A. Parker, 1840, and J. C. Fremont, 1845. Geologist Dr. John Evans collected the first fossil fish, described as Clupea humilis (later renamed Knightia eocaena), from the Green River beds in 1856. Edward Drinker Cope collected extensively from the area and produced several publications on the fossil fish from 1870 onwards. Ferdinand Vandeveer Hayden (geologist-in-charge of the United States Geological and Geographical Survey of the Territories, the forerunner of the United States Geological Survey) first used the name "Green River Shales" for the fossil sites in 1869.

Millions of fish fossils have been collected from the area, commercial collectors operating from legal quarries on state and private land have been responsible for the majority of Green River vertebrate fossils in public and private collections all over the world.

Oil shale

The Green River Formation contains the largest oil shale deposit in the world. However, the estimates of recoverable oil has been questioned, back in 2013, by geophysicist Raymond T. Pierrehumbert, who argued that the technology for recovering oil from the Green River oil shale deposit had not been developed and had not been profitably implemented at any significant scale.

Green River oil shale is lacustrine type lamosite. The organic matter is from blue-green algae (cyanobacteria).

Notable mineral deposits
The unusual chemistry of the lakes in which it was deposited makes the Green River Formation a major source of sodium carbonate. In southwest Wyoming the formation contains the world's largest deposits of trona, and in Colorado, the world's largest deposits of nahcolite. Another unusual mineral, currently only known from the Parachute Creek member is the crystalline nickel porphyrin mineral abelsonite.

See also
 Florissant Formation (Florissant Fossil Beds National Monument), a similarly fossiliferous, but younger freshwater Eocene formation in the Colorado Rocky Mountains.
 History of the oil shale industry in the United States
 Lagerstätte
 List of fossil sites (with link directory)

References

Further reading
 Geologic Atlas of the Rocky Mountain Region, Rocky Mountain Association of Geologists, 1972, Denver Colorado
 King, Philip B., 1977, The Evolution of North America, Revised edition, Princeton University Press
 Gaggiano, Tom, The Green River Formation  Accessed March 18, 2006.
 Carrol, Alan, 2001, Green River research project, http://www.geology.wisc.edu/~carroll/green_river.html Accessed March 18, 2006.

External links

 Minerals of the Green River Formation, Sweetwater County, Wyoming, Mindat
 Green River Formation UCMP Berkeley website
 Eocene fossils from the Green River Formation
 Fossil fish of the Green River Formation
 Fossil birds of the Green River Formation
 Paleobiology Database: Icaronycteris Type Locality: Wasatchian, Wyoming, aka Fossil Lake, Green River
 Paleobiology Database Green River Quarry: Kimmeridgian - Tithonian, Utah
 Paleobiology Database: BYU Locality #712, Uintah Basin, Green River Formation, Utah: Eocene - Eocene, Utah
 Green River Formation and Shale Oil, Research Brief by Rand 

Geology of the Rocky Mountains
Geologic formations of Colorado
Geologic formations of Utah
Geologic formations of Wyoming
Green River (Colorado River tributary)
Eocene United States
Lagerstätten
Oil shale in the United States
Oil shale formations
Paleogene Colorado
Paleogene geology of Utah
Paleogene geology of Wyoming
Paleontology in Colorado
Paleontology in Utah
Paleontology in Wyoming
Geological type localities
Eocene Series of North America